Amy Valor Meselson (December 4, 1971 – July 22, 2018) was the managing lawyer for the New York City-based Immigrant Justice Corps.

She worked in the immigration law unit of New York's Legal Aid Society from 2002, helping then-high school student Amadou Ly and other migrant children. In 2016 she traveled to Greece to volunteer at a Syrian refugee camp. She was managing attorney for the Immigrant Justice Corps when she committed suicide at home on July 22, 2018. In addition to the depression she had been battling since she was a child, The Independent wrote, "She had also recently been diagnosed with extreme anxiety and attention deficit disorder, conditions that may have been exacerbated by the time she spent at the camp."

Family and education
Born in Boston to Matthew and Sarah Page Meselson, she received her Bachelor's degree from Brown University and a Master's from Harvard University, both in philosophy. She received her J.D. from Yale.

References

1971 births
2018 suicides
2018 in New York City
American people of Jewish descent
20th-century American women lawyers
Deaths by person in New York City
Harvard University alumni
New York (state) lawyers
Yale Law School alumni
20th-century American lawyers
21st-century American women
Suicides in New York City